{{Infobox character
| name            = Noctis Lucis Caelum
| image           = NoctisLucisCaelum.png
| series          = Final Fantasy
| caption         = Noctis wielding the Engine Blade, as drawn by Tetsuya Nomura for Dissidia Final Fantasy NT
| color           = black
| first           = E3 2006 Teaser Trailer for Final Fantasy Versus XIII ' (2006)
| firstgame       = Final Fantasy XV (2016)
| creator         = Tetsuya Nomura
| designer        = Tetsuya NomuraHiromu TakaharaYusuke Naora
| voice           = EnglishRay ChaseHyrum Hansen (child)Japanese'''Tatsuhisa SuzukiMiyuki Satō (child)
| motion_actor    = Takuma Harada
| portrayer       = 
}}

,  for short, is a fictional character from Square Enix's Final Fantasy video game series. Noctis is a playable character and the main protagonist of Final Fantasy XV, which was originally a spin-off titled Final Fantasy Versus XIII. The crown prince and protector of Lucis, Noctis, and his allies must reclaim their country when the empire of Niflheim attacks Lucis in an attempt to take control of its magical crystal. Noctis has also appeared in the game's expanded media, including Final Fantasy crossover titles and other games, including Puzzle & Dragons and the fighting game Tekken 7.

Noctis was created and co-designed by Tetsuya Nomura, and his design was later revised by Yusuke Naora. Nomura created Noctis as a type of protagonist that had not before been used in a leading role in the Final Fantasy series, focusing on realism. Hiromu Takahara, lead designer for Japanese fashion house Roen, designed Noctis' clothes to be asymmetric, mirroring the fashion house's trademark style, and indicative of the game's themes and atmosphere. Before his design was finalized, Noctis was given a story-inspired, temporary outfit that was used in early trailers.

Since being revealed, Noctis's appearance has been compared with those of other asocial characters in the series. Journalists have positively received Noctis, many of whom noted his growth during the story and contrasted him with other Final Fantasy protagonists. His appearances in the expanded media of Final Fantasy XV and other games have prompted multiple types of responses.

Creation
Design

Noctis was created and designed by Tetsuya Nomura, the original director of Final Fantasy XV, which was originally titled Final Fantasy Versus XIII and was planned as a series spin-offs within the Fabula Nova Crystallis sub-series and companion to Final Fantasy XIII. Nomura did not want Noctis to look strong but to be used to communicate the story's darkness, which caused some difficulties for the team. His full name loosely translates from Latin into "Light of [the] Night Sky"; his nickname Noct translates as "of the Night". Noctis' name was not going to be based on the sky or weather, as with previous protagonists Nomura designed. The character was named after Lightning, the main protagonist of Final Fantasy XIII, was given a weather-based name. This name was a reference to Sora, the main protagonist of the Kingdom Hearts series; Sora and Caelum both mean "sky" in their respective languages, and Nomura considered Noctis to be his latest "son".

The character's clothing was designed by Hiromu Takahara, the main designer at Japanese fashion house Roen. Takahara's key inspiration for the clothing's style and coloring was "jet black", which was meant to exemplify and represent of the game's atmosphere. Takahara designed the outfit along the same lines as the asymmetrical designs that are common to Roen's clothing lines. His outfit was designed to make Noctis look as though he went to a high-class public house. Roen created a set of real clothes and kept them in the office for reference by the developers; Nomura had been constantly asked by graphic artists which materials his characters' outfits were made from. When the game was first revealed, Noctis wore a temporary outfit while his final look was being created. The character's temporary clothing was based on the game's script to give a visual impression in trailers. Takahara also designed a formal suit for Noctis, which he wears in the original opening section of the game. All Roen designs, including Noctis' suit, were retained when Versus XIII was rebranded as Final Fantasy XV because the team felt the looks should not be changed.

While the game changed names, platforms and eventually directors, Nomura worked with new director Hajime Tabata to ensure  Noctis remained as unchanged as possible in the final product. Naora supervised changes to his character model. The main goal was to make Noctis appear realistic; his skin texture was enhanced and subtleties were added to its depiction and the effect of different lighting on it, and elements such as subtle birthmarks and skin blotches were added. One of the major goals was keeping the same character impression while making adjustments and enhancements because series fans already had a concept of the character. His hair shadow effects needed to be adjusted after an upgrade in technology so they did not cast too much shade on his face, while the hairstyle was kept consistent. His hairstyle was meant to look ordered from the front but wild from the rear. To make his hair movements realistic, the team worked with a professional hairstylist to create the design using a mannequin's wig, then used the Luminous Engine to render it in real-time—a technique that was first used for the characters in the engine's 2012 tech demo Agni's Philosophy.

Noctis's aging during the course of Final Fantasy XV was major departure from previous Japanese role-playing game protagonists. The developers made the change despite fearing a poor reception from fans; Tabata said it "felt that it was important in communicating [the party's] development and wanting to express it in a way that we only can with the current generation of consoles". When creating the development of Noctis' facial features over time, the team used photographs of war veterans and actors to add fine details to mature the character's expressions. His features were designed to be similar to Regis, reflecting the game's theme of the father-son relationship. Noctis' mature appearance was designed by art co-director Yusuke Naora. A version of Noctis was incorporated into a new post-game version of the Yoshitaka Amano-designed logo. The logo was included based on a request by Noctis's Japanese voice actor Tatsuhisa Suzuki to include him. This combined logo was described as representing both the beginning of a new journey, and the game's development history.

Attributes
Noctis was originally one of four controllable characters in Versus XIII, and is the sole playable character in Final Fantasy XV. He is the only character who can use summoned monsters, recurring elements in the Final Fantasy series. Noctis can manipulate multiple weapons at once; his special technique  also enables him to summon crystalline weapons known as  into battle. In the story, these powers are passed down through the royal line of Lucis. Nomura said while Noctis was overpowered in the first E3 trailer, by the timeVersus XIII was drafted, the character was weakened until the player grants Noctis several weapons. Early in the game's development Noctis was the only character in the world of XV that could use magic, which would not have worked from a gameplay standpoint so the team engineered it so Noctis' companions could share Noctis' magical abilities. At some points during both story scenes and gameplay, Noctis' eyes, which are normally blue, turn red. This feature was present in both Versus XIII and Final Fantasy XV.

Personality
Nomura did not want Noctis to have a personality like Squall Leonhart or Cloud Strife, the respective protagonists of Final Fantasy VIII and VII, defining their personality type as that of "a silent, gloomy little boy". Nomura wanted to create a realistic character type that had not yet been seen in the Final Fantasy. Nomura was wary about the character because he was new to the series and might fall "out of bounds". To avoid interfering with player empathy, earlier protagonists did not have strong personalities. Nomura wanted Noctis to have "an overabundance of idiosyncrasy" so he would leave an impression on the player. Nomura also wanted the character to perform actions that bore both heroic and villainous traits, creating someone akin to an anti-hero. He thought these qualities would match the game's themes very well. Noctis hides his shyness under a cold exterior, through which his close friends can see. A key scene in Versus XIII that demonstrates his personality  is his first meeting with Stella Nox Fleuret, the game's original female lead. Tabata wanted gamers to immerse themselves in Noctis' character by learning everything from his point of view. Some scenes might be confusing to both the player and his avatar. The choice of the game's theme song, a cover of Ben E. King's "Stand by Me" performed by Florence and the Machine, was meant as a message of gratitude from Noctis, which he is unable to express in words. While also caring for his teammates, Noctis relates to Talcott Hester, a side character in the narrative, due to their parallels.

The bond between Noctis and his father, and the Regalia and its representation in the story of Final Fantasy XV, was important to Tabata, according to whom children in Japan are proud of their father's car; it is a "big thing" to go on a ride and have one's father explain the car's functions. Tabata listed this as a wonderful experience from his childhood and wanted to present it in the game. According to Tabata, Noctis' cool mannerisms and reserved exterior stem from his lonely childhood and a fear of losing those closest to him. His words and actions stem from a fear of disappointing those around him, causing him to work to fulfill expectations and bring people happiness. When comparing the personalities of Noctis and Lunafreya Nox Fleuret, Tabata said Noctis as the weaker of the two, and that Noctis needs protection instead of her. Noctis' transition from prince to king is a key part of the narrative. According to scenario writer Saori Itamuro, Noctis faces the future as king with both dread and acceptance, having been raised to expect such an event. This part of his story influenced aspects of his appearance. Noctis' fate to battle the antagonist is a major tragedy because while Noctis defeats his nemesis, he dies in the aftermath, reuniting with Luna in the afterlife. Accordin to the developers, the rivalry between Noctis and Ardyn rivalry is unusual in the franchise because the two initially are on friendly terms despite the development of their hatred for each other.

Voice actors and localization
Suzuki voiced Noctis as an adult, with Miyuki Satō  portraying him as a child. Suzuki was cast in 2009, seven years before the game's final release, when the project still had the Versus XIII name. When he was first voicing the character, Suzuki said Noctis was far more introverted, speaking with a gruff manner and showing little sympathy for those beyond his immediate circle. When the project was retitled Final Fantasy XV, Suzuki worked with the production team to create a new persona for Noctis, who became more outgoing and emotional. Suzuki recorded his lines for the game with the rest of the main cast. Suzuki modeled Noctis' persona on the stage mannerisms of Kurt Cobain, former lead singer of the grunge band Nirvana. While he did not do continuous work on the game due to the production's "twists and turns", he found himself constantly keeping Noctis in mind so he could easily portray him in recording sessions. According to Suzuki, some of the recordings he made for Versus XIII were used in Final Fantasy XV.  When playing Noctis for the anime series Brotherhood: Final Fantasy XV, Suzuki talked with the main cast, with whom he had established a good rapport, about shifting their portrayals for the altered storytelling medium.

Noctis is voiced in English by Ray Chase as an adult and by Hyrum Hansen as a child. Speaking about his role, Chase was told rather than create an English version of the Japanese performance outside a few select scenes, Chase was to make a performance that would resonate with Western audiences, resulting in Noctis' English version being noticeably different from the Japanese one. If anything seemed wrong, localization directors Inoue and Keythe Farley would have Chase re-record his dialogue. Noctis was Chase's first Final Fantasy character and his first lead role in a video game project. He was initially shocked when he was told what character he would be voicing. Group recording sessions were discontinued because developers needed to match the timings of English dialogue and the Japanese performances. The game's opening scene, in which Noctis sets out on his journey, is the only one that was recorded with several English-speaking actors together. Localization lead writer Dan Inoue's English-language interpretation of the character is based by Suzuki's influence. Inoue avoided what he called the "emo" role-playing stereotype for the character. To keep the main group's dialogue natural, Inoue created a character relationship chart to maintain stylistic consistency.

English voice work was included for Episode Duscae but it was cut close in terms of production scheduling. During the ROM-checking stage, Tabata felt the performance was wrong for the character, an opinion reflected in player feedback after the demo's release, but it was too late to re-record. Tabata said the original performance made the character sound too old, comparing it negatively to Batman. After release, the voice work was redone to show the character's youth and charm, along with his "sense of ennui". Due to the feedback from Episode Duscae recasting Noctis was considered, but instead Chase worked with the localization team to find a different voice for Noctis. After putting together a demo reel of Chase performing a variety of lines, Tabata chose the one he thought best suited the character. According to Chase, the most emotional part of the original recording was Noctis's final farewell to his comrades during a post-credit scene, which for him symbolized saying goodbye to the localization team. Noctis's scene on his throne at the end of the game needed re-recording; originally sounding on the point of tears, the dialogue was re-recorded to emphasize Noctis's resolve.

 Appearances 
Final Fantasy XV
Noctis Lucis Caelum is the only son and heir of King Regis Lucis Caelum CXIII of Lucis. The Caelum dynasty safeguards the Crystal, an artifact connected to the Astrals, god-like protectors for the world of Eos. When he was five years old, the Crystal chose Noctis as the "True King", a prophesied figure who would purge Eos of the Starscourge, a plague that will trigger eternal darkness on Eos and turns living things into monstrous Daemons. At eight years old, Noctis is attacked by a Daemon and is sent to the nation of Tenebrae for healing, where he meets and bonds with its princess Lunafreya. Noctis and Regis are forced to flee Tenebrae when it is attacked by the Niflheim Empire. By the time of the events of Final Fantasy XV, Niflheim has besieged Lucis and Regis agrees to a ceasefire. As part of the treaty, Noctis will marry Lunafreya; Regis dispatches him to Altissia where they are to be married. Following Noctis' departure, Niflheim attacks Lucis' capital Insomnia, steals the Crystal and kills Regis. Noctis, with his companions and sworn protectors Gladiolus Amicitia, Prompto Argentum and Ignis Scientia, sets out on a quest to retrieve the Crystal and defeat Niflheim.

To fulfill his role, Noctis collects the Royal Arms—weapons of the ancient Lucian monarchs—from tombs across Lucis, and gains the blessing of the Astrals. He is in turn aided remotely by Lunafreya, and in person by her attendant Gentiana, and Niflheim's chancellor Ardyn Izunia. Ardyn is later revealed to be Ardyn Lucis Caelum, immortal older brother of Noctis's ancestor Somnus, who swore revenge on both the Crystal and Somnus's bloodline when corrupted by the Starscourge. Noctis gains the favor of the Astrals Titan and Ramuh, but Ardyn mortally wounds Lunafreya and disrupts the ritual to summon Leviathan. With a last effort, Lunafreya helps Noctis subdue the rampaging Leviathan before giving him the Ring of the Lucii, an artifact through which he can access the Crystal's magic. Burdened by the loss of Lunafreya and tormented by Ardyn, Noctis heads for Niflheim's capital Gralea.

Arriving in Gralea to find its population turned into Daemons, Noctis finds and is pulled into the Crystal, where he learns from the Astral Bahamut that he combine his power with the Astrals and the Crystal to destroy the Starscourge, the price being his life. Ten years later, Noctis awakens and reunites with his companions; they travel to Insomnia where they defeat the rogue Astral Ifrit and the enslaved Lucii before facing Ardyn. After defeating Ardyn in the physical world, Noctis sacrifices himself to fulfill his role as the True King by purging the Starscourge, destroying Ardyn's spirit in the afterlife with the aid of the Lucii. In the game's mid-credits and post-credit scenes, Noctis confesses his feelings for his friends during a rest before the final battle, and reunites with Lunafreya in the afterlife.

Final Fantasy XV-related appearances
Noctis is one of the main characters in Brotherhood: Final Fantasy XV, an original net animation that follows his early life and the story of his companions. The animation tells the story of Noctis and those of his companions from his childhood to the game's opening. The first and last episodes tie into the events of Platinum Demo: Final Fantasy XV, a free tech demo showing Noctis' journey through a dreamworld during a near-death experience. In the opening and concluding episodes, Noctis learns of the fall of Lucis and faces the Daemon that nearly killed him in his youth. Initially helpless against it, he draws strength from his friends and the memories of his father to kill the Daemon. The game Final Fantasy XV: Pocket Edition features a chibi Noctis as a playable character.

Noctis briefly appears as a young child in a wheelchair in the 2016 CGI movie Kingsglaive, and during a post-credits scene at the beginning of his journey to Lestallum. Noctis is also the main character of the manga adaptation of Final Fantasy XV.A King's Tale, which is set thirty years before the base game's events, follows the exploits of Regis being told to a young Noctis as a fairy tale.

Noctis would have been the central character of a planned downloadable content (DLC) episode Episode Noctis: The Final Strike, the finale of a planned tetralogy of DLC episodes that were titled Dawn of the Future. The first installment, Episode Ardyn, was published but the remaining episodes were canceled. Noctis plays a minor role in Episode Ignis, in which the title character protects him from danger and can create an alternative ending in which Noctis remains as the living king after Ignis defeats Ardyn.  In Episode Prompto, Noctis expresses his guilt over being tricked by Ardyn into attacking Prompto, and plays a small role in Episode Gladios.

The canceled DLC was used as the basis for the novel Final Fantasy XV: The Dawn of the Future, which begins with an alternative ending to Episode Ardyn. In The Dawn of the Future, Noctis enters the Crystal and learns the truth behind Ardyn's past and Lunafreya's role. Outside, Ardyn has defied his role in Bahamut's plans and Lunafreya is resurrected as part of a plan to purge Eos of life using Bahamut's "final summoning" Teraflare. Noctis rebels against Bahamut, allowing Ardyn to complete the ritual of Providence in his place. While Ardyn destroys Bahamut's spiritual self, Noctis destroys Bahamut's physical form and saves Lunafreya. With both the Starscourge and magic gone from the world, the population sets about rebuilding and Noctis marries Lunafreya.

In other DLC, Noctis wears a costume from Assassin's Creed.

Other appearances

Noctis appears as a guest character in Itadaki Street: Dragon Quest and Final Fantasy 30th Anniversary, and as a playable character in the mobile spin-off Final Fantasy Brave Exvius and the crossover fighting game Dissidia Final Fantasy NT. Noctis' appearance was delayed until the launch of Final Fantasy XV. Noctis' original costume created by Nomura for the first trailers of Versus XIII is available as DLC. The Engine Blade also appears for 2B to wield in Nier Automata, while his design also appears in Final Fantasy XIV.

Outside Final Fantasy, Noctis appears as a DLC character in Bandai Namco's fighting game Tekken 7 as a friend of Lars Alexandersson. Lars' voice actor, Junichi Suwabe, enjoyed the interactions between both Lars and Noctis. Tekken producer Katsuhiro Harada commented it was his idea to include Noctis within the game, resurrecting old concepts for a series crossover dating back to the original PlayStation era. Harada wanted to surprise fans by including an RPG character in a fighting game; he sought permission from Tabata to feature him in Namco's game. The developers wanted to emulate Noctis' techniques from Final Fantasy XV with their own hardware. He was created to be accessible to newcomers of the Tekken franchise. They received a model to follow from Square Enix. Besides Noctis' regular costume, he wears an original hooded outfit created by the Namco staff. More alternative outfits were created by Square Enix staff. Noctis was featured in a collaboration with Puzzle & Dragons. Bkub Okawa, author of the comedy manga Pop Team Epic, parodied Noctis and Ignis as  super deformed designs.

Reception
Critical response

Video-game publications have commented on Noctis' character. After Final Fantasy XV was revealed, the audience called him a "standard-issue brash anime kid in demeanor" and compared him with the rebellious Final Fantasy VIII main character Squall Leonhart and other "cold" characters. Some players found Noctis nice due to his interactions with his friends, as well as his expressive personality; Eurogamer comparing him with Final Fantasy X protagonist Tidus because both become more likable as gameplay continues. Several critics enjoyed Noctis' role in Brotherhood because of the way he develops his relationships with his friends. In an early review of the game's demo Episode Duscae, GameSpot's Alexa Ray Corriae praised the interactions between Noctis and his companions, citing them as a good example of deep platonic love between men.

Following the release of Final Fantasy XV, critical response to Noctis was more positive. Escapist Magazine regarded him as one of the franchise's most complex characters due to the way he completes his duties as king, although he comes across as a messianic figure, saving the world using his own life as payment. According to Becky Cunningham of Cheat Code Central, Noctis is "apathethic" in pre-release trailers but the reviewer found Noctis' characterization in the final version of Final Fantasy XV more enjoyable than that of the trailers. Game Informer writer Andrew Reiner referred to Noctis as a "great leader" and "an interesting, conflicted character, torn between his duties to the kingdom and wanting a different life". Despite criticising the lack of explanation about Noctis not wanting to take over his kingdom, EGMNOW's Mollie L. Patterson praised the character's growth from adolescence and his adult design. Dustin Bailey from Anime News Network praised the interactions between Noctis and his friends, saying "Noctis' brooding silence" makes some scenes feel realistic. Carter compared Noctis and his allies to the cast of Final Fantasy VI, a highly acclaimed title of the franchise, but found Noctis overpowered. The Mary Sue commented on Noctis' design, finding early garments juvenile and unfit for a prince, especially one who must o bring peace to the world. During the final chapter Noctis wears clothes identical to those of King Regis, symbolically showing his growth into a more fitting hero.

The romance between Noctis and Lunafreya was often found to be underdeveloped compared with previous Final Fantasy couples, who share more time together. Salvatore Pane, writing for Paste Magazine regarded Noctis' failure to save Luna as one of the character's strongest reactions because he expresses grief in tears and silence, gviing him an air of realism while making more connections to the player. Both Pane and Kotaku, and Philip Kollar of the website Polygon praised the ending; Kotaku enjoyed the dark atmosphere the older protagonist brings when fighting Ardyn. VG247 compared the ending to the final conflict between Cloud Strife and Sephiroth in Final Fantasy VII due to the focus on their rivalry and how quickly the player has to sacrifice Noctis to destroy Ardyn's soul; and said the voice acting of Ray Chase provides more tragic and emotive focus. Kotaku said Ravus is a more-fitting enemy for Noctis than Ardyn due to the former's tragic story and relationship with Lunafreya. Noctis' role in The Dawn of the Future divided opinions due to its thematic relation to the original game, but the exploration of Noctis' romance with Lunafreya was praised and contrasted with the game. According to Jacob Hull from Push Square, A King's Tale further expands upon Noctis' personality and his relationship with Regis, who lacked development in the series' other media.

Noctis' inclusion as DLC in the fighting game Tekken 7 earned multiple reactions. Rock, Paper, Shotgun found him fitting based on Noctis' and the rest of the cast's skills, and joked about his relationship with Tekken character Lars. Kotaku noted a crowd of fans cheered for him when he was first announced. Others found his inclusion unfitting. A writer from Kotaku agreed, addressing multiple complaints about the fans' wish for Kazuma Kiryu from Yakuza as a guest character instead. Den of Geek was curious about Noctis' fighting style in the game, which appeared to combine hand-to-hand combat with magic techniques, making his modus operandi one of "hit 'em with something sharp". Destructoid also enjoyed Noctis' inclusion in Dissidia NT, saying it fits the cast of previous Final Fantasy heroes.

Popularity
A Play Arts Kai figurine of Noctis was  developed and a fragrance was created in the character's image.  An internet meme that focused on Noctis and his friends in the Regalia looking at electronically edited images was developed; Square Enix producer Shinji Hashimoto found the meme comical and motivated fans to produce more to increase interest in Final Fantasy XV. The Gamer listed Noctis as one of the most-overpowered characters in Final Fantasy due to the number of moves he learns during the game. In a 2020 NHK poll, Noctis was voted the 14th-best Final Fantasy character. In 2016, Battleborn artist Scott Kester did an homage to Final Fantasy XV in the form of an artwork of Noctis and Phoebe.

In a 2017 Famitsu poll, Noctis was voted as the most-wanted character fans expect to appear in Square Enix's franchise Kingdom Hearts. For the game Kingdom Hearts III, a new character named Yozora was used as two cameos and a boss fight. Kotaku said Yozora shared several physical similarities with Noctis, most noticeably in the Final Fantasy Versus XIII'' trailers. When asked about similarities between Noctis and Yozora, Nomura stated while there are several similarities between the two characters, they are not connected.

References

Characters designed by Tetsuya Nomura
Fictional swordfighters in video games
Fictional fishers
Fictional characters with evocation or summoning abilities
Final Fantasy characters
Final Fantasy XV
Male characters in video games
Prince characters in video games
King characters in video games
Square Enix protagonists
Video game bosses
Video game characters introduced in 2016
Video game characters who can teleport
Video game characters who use magic

ja:ファイナルファンタジーXV#主要人物